Chhoti Jathani ( "Younger Elder Brother's Wife") is a 2021 Indian Punjabi Drama television series that premiered on 14 June 2021 on Zee Punjabi. It is available on the digital platform ZEE5 before it's telecast. It is produced under the banner of Zee Studios and stars Gurjeet Singh Channi, Mandeep Kaur and Seerat Kapoor in the lead roles. It is an official remake of Marathi series Tujhyat Jeev Rangala. It ended on 11 November 2022 and is replaced by Dildariyan.

Plot 
Ajooni and Zorawar get married despite coming from different backgrounds. But the two faces problems in life when Zorawar's sister-in-law, Savreen, tries to establish her dominance in the household.

Cast 
 Gurjeet Singh Channi as Zorawar Singh Bajwa, Ajooni's husband. (2021-2022)
 Mandeep Kaur as Ajooni Sidhu, Zorawar's wife. (2021-2022)
 Seerat Kapoor as Savreen Kaur Bajwa, Zorawar's sister-in-law. (2021-2022)
 Shivangi Shahi replaced Seerat Kapoor as Savreen Kaur Bajwa. (2021-2022)
 Nazish as Chanchal. (2021-2022)
 Abhishek Mehta as Jashan Singh Bajwa. (2021-2022)
 Amandeep as Channi Bua. (2021-2022)
 Vishal Saini as Navdeep Singh Bajwa. (2021-2022)
 Naresh Nikki as Professor Tib. (2021-2022)

Adaptations

References

External links 
 
 Chhoti Jathani at ZEE5

2021 Indian television series debuts
Punjabi-language television shows
Zee Punjabi original programming
2022 Indian television series endings